The Romantics is a 2023 English-language documentary series created by Smriti Mundhra for Netflix, featuring the legacy of Yash Chopra and Yash Raj Films. Written by Smriti Mundhra and Michael T Vollmann, the four-part series showcases the 50-year-old legacy of YRF Entertainment, which saw the late Yash Raj Chopra and his son, Aditya Chopra, redefine Bollywood cinema with romantic films, featuring unseen footage and exclusive stories shared by actors including Amitabh Bachchan, Aamir Khan, Shah Rukh Khan, Hrithik Roshan, Ranveer Singh, Anushka Sharma.

Overview 
Smriti Mundra, director of A Suitable Girl and Indian Matchmaking, shot the series over the course of three years. This documentary project features interviews with 35 of Bollywood's film stars, including Amitabh Bachchan, Salim Khan, Sooraj Barjatya, Anil Kapoor, Juhi Chawla, Kajol, Rishi Kapoor, Karan Johar, Madhuri Dixit, Neetu Singh, Salman Khan, Saif Ali Khan, and Rani Mukerji. Through archival footage and interviews, the documentary captures the highs and lows of Yash Chopra's career.

Reception 
Suchin Mehrotra of Hindustan Times in his review stated "The Romantics works best when it uses the YRF filmography merely as a stepping off point to discuss Hindi cinema as a whole. The show comes to us at a time when it feels like filmmakers are looking back and celebrating what was."

A reviewer for Indian Express stated "It’s all rah-rah, hardly any nose-digs, but then you don’t really expect any in a series like this, about the biggest, most storied production house in Hindi cinema."

Renuka Vyavahare at The Times of India rated season 1 4 stars out of 5 and remarked "The Romantics is a treat to watch if you love Hindi cinema and Yash Chopra, which are pretty much synonymous."

Shubham Kulkarni from Koimoi rated 4/5 and wrote "The Romantics is an ode to the man who defined Hindi cinema for decades and even died with his director’s hat on."

The series secured 80% on reviews aggregator site Rotten Tomatoes.

Episodes

Season 1

Referenes

External links 
 
 The Romantics Netflix

Indian documentary television series
2022 web series debuts